Zieglergasse  is a station on  of the Vienna U-Bahn. It is located in the Mariahilf District. It opened in 1993.

References

External links 
 

Buildings and structures in Mariahilf
Railway stations opened in 1993
Vienna U-Bahn stations
1993 establishments in Austria
Railway stations in Austria opened in the 20th century